Mordellistena reitteri is a species of beetle in the genus Mordellistena of the family Mordellidae. It was described by Friedrich Julius Schilsky in 1894.

References

Beetles described in 1894
reitteri